Alejandro Padilla (born January 28, 2001) is an American soccer player who plays as a defender for the Colorado Rapids academy.

References

External links
Profile at US Development Academy

2001 births
Living people
Colorado Springs Switchbacks FC players
American soccer players
Association football defenders
Soccer players from Colorado
USL Championship players
Sportspeople from Colorado Springs, Colorado